Oyewale Tomori (born 3 February 1946, Osun State, Nigeria) is a Nigerian  professor of virology, educational administrator, and former vice chancellor of Redeemer's University.

Life and career
Tomori was born in Ilesa, Osun State, Nigeria on 3 February 1946. He received a Doctor of Veterinary Medicine(DVM) from Ahmadu Bello University, Zaria as well as a Doctorate degree, Ph.D in virology from the University of Ibadan, Oyo State, Nigeria where he was appointed professor of virology in 1981, the same year he received the United States Department of Health and Human Services Public Health Service Certificate for contributions to Lassa Fever Research. Three years (1984) after his appointment as a professor of virology, he was appointed the head of the Department of Virology. At the University of Ibadan Tomori's research interest focuses on viral infections including Ebola hemorrhagic fever, yellow fever, Lassa fever. He served as the Regional Virologist for the World Health Organization Africa Region (1994-2004) before he was appointed as the pioneer vice chancellor of Redeemer's University, Ogun State, Nigeria, a tenure that ended in 2011.

Other activities
Global Polio Eradication Initiative (GPEI), Member of the Polio Research Committee (PRC)
International Consortium on Anti-Virals (ICAV), Member of the International Steering Committee
Nigeria Expert Review Committee on Polio Eradication and Routine Immunization, Chairman
World Health Organization, Member of the Strategic Group of Experts on Immunization (SAGE)
Gavi Alliance, Board Member 2017

Awards and fellowships
He is a recipient of several awards and fellow of many international academic organizations. Among others are;
Nigeria National Order of Merit (NNOM) (2002), the country's highest award for academic excellence. He is the incumbent President of the Nigerian Academy of Science 
United States Department of Health and Human Services Public Health Service Certificate
Nigeria National Ministry of Science and Technology Merit Award for excellence in medical research
Fellow of the Academy of Science of Nigeria.
Fellow of the College of Veterinary Surgeons of Nigeria
Fellow of the Royal College of Pathologists of the United Kingdom
International member of the United States National Academy of Medicine
Fellow of the American Society of Tropical Medicine and Hygiene (2013)

Selected works

Most cited works
The reemergence of Ebola hemorrhagic fever, Democratic Republic of the Congo, 1995 
 Yellow fever: a decade of reemergence
Review of cases of nosocomial Lassa fever in Nigeria: the high price of poor medical practice 
 The revised global yellow fever risk map and recommendations for vaccination, 2010: consensus of the Informal WHO Working Group on Geographic Risk for Yellow 
 Monoclonal antibodies to lymphocytic choriomeningitis and pichinde viruses: generation, characterization, and cross-reactivity with other arenaviruses

Others 
Yellow fever: the recurring plague 
Randomised controlled trials for Ebola: practical and ethical issues 
 Risk factors for Marburg hemorrhagic fever, Democratic Republic of the Congo 
 Transmission dynamics and control of Ebola virus disease outbreak in Nigeria, July to September 2014 
 Multiple independent emergences of type 2 vaccine-derived polioviruses during a large outbreak in northern Nigeria 
 Viral hemorrhagic fever antibodies in Nigerian populations 
Yellow fever vaccination and pregnancy: a four-year prospective study
Urban yellow fever epidemic in western Nigeria, 1987 
The global virome project 
Recovery of a Lassa-related arenavirus in Zimbabwe 
Toward a common secure future: four global commissions in the wake of Ebola 
Genomic analysis of Lassa virus during an increase in cases in Nigeria in 2018 
Impact of yellow fever on the developing world 
Monoclonal antibodies to lymphocytic choriomeningitis virus react with pathogenic arenaviruses 
Global incidence of serogroup B invasive meningococcal disease: a systematic review

See also 
List of vice chancellors in Nigeria

References

1946 births
Living people
Yoruba scientists
Ahmadu Bello University alumni
University of Ibadan alumni
Academic staff of Redeemer's University Nigeria
Yoruba academics
People from Osun State
Nigerian virologists
Vice-Chancellors of Nigerian universities
Recipients of the Nigerian National Order of Merit Award
Fellows of the American Society of Tropical Medicine and Hygiene
Members of the National Academy of Medicine